USS R-9 (SS-86) was an R-class coastal and harbor defense submarine of the United States Navy.

Construction and commissioning
R-9′s keel was laid down on 6 March 1918 by the Fore River Shipbuilding Company, Quincy, Massachusetts. She was launched on  24 May 1919, sponsored by Mrs. Irving E. Stowe, and commissioned on 30 July 1919.

Service history

1919–1931
Following fitting out and shakedown, R-9, given hull classification symbol SS-86 in July 1920, operated along the northeast coast primarily in the New London, Connecticut—Newport, Rhode Island area until 1924.  Ordered to the Pacific in March of that year, she arrived at Pearl Harbor, her new homeport, on 4 May. Operations and exercises, from individual to fleet in scope, occupied the next six and a half years and on 12 December 1930 she got underway for return to the Atlantic. Retransiting the Panama Canal in mid-January 1931, she arrived at Philadelphia, Pennsylvania, on 9 February and reported for inactivation. Decommissioned on 2 May 1931, R-9 remained at Philadelphia, berthed with the Reserve Fleet.

1940–1946
In September 1940 R-9 was placed in reduced commission, then moved up the coast to New London where she completed activation and was placed in full commission on 14 March 1941.

Within two months R-9 was en route to the Caribbean Sea and duty under Commander, Panama Sea Frontier. Arriving at Coco Solo on 27 May, she patrolled the approaches to the vital inter-ocean canal with SubRon 3 into October, then returned north to New London for overhaul arriving on 23 May. During December she was attached to the Submarine School but, with the new year, 1942, the submarine proceeded to Casco Bay, Maine, for operational training. From mid-month on, through the U-boat offensive of 1942 and early 1943, she rotated between New London and Bermuda to patrol the shipping lanes which transited the Eastern Sea Frontier and the Bermuda Patrol Areas. Shifted to ASW training programs in the spring of 1943, she operated primarily in the New London area for most of the remainder of World War II. In late March 1945 she moved south again, trained with destroyers, destroyer escorts, and escort carriers off Cuba and southern Florida. Then, in mid-May, she returned to New London.

On 20 September R-9 proceeded to Portsmouth, New Hampshire, where she decommissioned on 25 September 1945. Struck from the Naval Vessel Register on 11 October 1945, she was scrapped in February 1946.

References

External links
 

United States R-class submarines
World War II submarines of the United States
Ships built in Quincy, Massachusetts
1919 ships